"You Take Me Up" is a song by British pop group Thompson Twins, released as the third single from their fourth studio album, Into the Gap (1984), on 19 March 1984. It was written by Tom Bailey, Alannah Currie and Joe Leeway and prominently features the harmonica and a melodica solo. In addition to the regular 7-inch and multiple 12-inch releases, Arista Records also released four different shaped picture discs for the single, three of which were part of a jigsaw.

The single peaked at number two in the United Kingdom, making it their highest-charting song, and spent 11 weeks on the chart. It was the UK's 57th-highest-selling single of 1984 and was certifified silver by the British Phonographic Industry (BPI) the same year. In the United States, the single spent nine weeks on the Billboard Hot 100, peaking at number 44 in October 1984. The promotional music video for this single was directed by Dieter Trattmann.

"Passion Planet"
The B-side of the single was a non-album track entitled "Passion Planet". This song became especially popular in Los Angeles, CA, receiving "heavy" rotation on several radio stations (e.g., KROQ-FM) which preferred it instead of "You Take Me Up". It became one of the top songs of 1984 in Los Angeles.

Track listings
7-inch single
A. "You Take Me Up" – 3:55
B. "Passion Planet" – 3:42

UK 12-inch single
A1. "You Take Me Up" (Machines Take Me Over) – 7:33
A2. "Down Tools" – 4:18
B1. "Leopard Ray" – 3:50
B2. "Passion Planet" – 3:05

UK limited-edition 12-inch single
A1. "You Take Me Up" (High Plains Mixer) – 8:30
B1. "You Take Me Up" (instrumental) – 6:20
B2. "Passion Planet" – 3:44

Australian cassette single
A1. "You Take Me Up / Machines Take Me Over" – 8:26
A2. "Down Tools" – 3:25
B1. "You Take Me Up" (U.S. dance mix) – 8:30
B2. "Passion Planet" – 3:44

Personnel
Thompson Twins
 Tom Bailey – writing, vocals, synthesizer, contrabass, harmonica, melodica, drum programming
 Alannah Currie – writing, percussion, marimba, xylophone, backing vocals, lyrics
 Joe Leeway – writing, congas, Prophet V, backing vocals

Other
 Produced by Alex Sadkin with Tom Bailey 
 Recorded and mixed by Phil Thornalley
 Photography – Paul Cox
 Artwork/Design – Satori (Andie Airfix)
 Art Direction – Alannah and Nic Marchant

Charts

Weekly charts

Year-end charts

Certifications

References

1984 singles
1984 songs
Arista Records singles
Songs written by Alannah Currie
Songs written by Joe Leeway
Songs written by Tom Bailey (musician)
Thompson Twins songs